Les Buffles Football Club du Borgou, famously known as Les Buffles du Borgou, is a Beninese professional football club based in Parakou, that competes in the Benin Premier League.

History
The club was founded on 1976 in Paraku under the name of Association Sportive Buffles FC du Borgou after the merger of the two major clubs of the city.

Crest

Achievements
Benin Premier League: 5
Champions: 1980, 1992, 2014, 2017, 2019.

Benin Cup: 3
Winners: 1979, 1982, 2001.
Runners-up: 2000.

Benin Supercup: 1
Winners: 2014.

Performance in CAF competitions
CAF Champions League / African Cup of Champions Clubs: 4 appearances
1993: withdraw
2015: Preliminary round
2018: Preliminary round
2020: Preliminary Round
2021: Preliminary Round

CAF Cup Winners' Cup: 1 appearance
1983: First Round

Notable players
 Raimi Kola
 Abdel-Djalil Bawa
 Adjai Moussa

Notable coaches
 Mohamed Abdoulaye

External links
Official website
Team profile - Soccerway.com

Football clubs in Benin
Parakou